The Métabetchouane East river is a tributary of the northeast shore of the Métabetchouane River, flowing in the Laurentides Wildlife Reserve, in the unorganized territory of Lac-Jacques-Cartier, in the La Côte-de-Beaupré Regional County Municipality, in the administrative region of Capitale-Nationale, in the province from Quebec, to Canada.

Forestry is the main economic activity in this valley; recreational tourism, second.

The surface of the Métabetchoune River (except the rapids zones) is usually frozen from the end of November to the beginning of April, however the safe circulation on the ice is generally done from mid-December to the end of March.

Geography 
The main watersheds neighboring the Métabetchouane Est river are:
 north side: Métabetchouane River, Rivière aux Écorces du Milieu;
 east side: Cavée River, Launière River;
 south side: Liane stream, Rivière de la Place, Métabetchouane River, Jacques-Cartier River;
 west side: Métabetchouane River, Brûlé Lake.

The Métabetchouane Est River takes its source at the mouth of "Lac des Hautes des Terres". Enclosed between mountains, this lake is linked on the north side by a small stream with the "Lac de la Hauteur" which turns out to be the head lake of the rivière aux Écorces du Milieu.

Upper course of the Métabetchouane East River (from its source) (segment of )

 southwards crossing  on Lake Mousseau, then Lake Aramis, to the outlet (coming from the north-west) from Lakes Athos and Porthos;
 to the south, forming a large S, up to the outlet (coming from the east) of Lac Bourbier;
 towards the west by forming a hook towards the south and meandering, until the outlet (coming from the southwest) of lakes Fretin, Tentant and Petit lac Tentant;
 north-east, to the outlet (coming from the north-east) from Lake Sigma;
 to the west, collecting the outlet (coming from the south) from Lac des Margouilies, and branching northwest to the Gratia stream (coming from the north);
 south-east, then south by collecting the discharge (coming from the east) from Badaillac, Lime and Frêle lakes, to the north shore of Missip lake;

Intermediate course of the Métabetchouane East river (segment of )

 to the west, sometimes winding and collecting the discharge (coming from the south-east) from the Nourrains and Bocage lakes;
 south-west, then north-west, up to Maria stream (coming from the north);
 north-west, up to a bend in the river;
 south-west, to the outlet (coming from the north-west) from lakes Boisseau, Dunoyon and Étang Florissant;

Lower course of the Métabetchouane Est river (segment of )

 first on  towards the south-west in a deep valley up to a bend of the river; then on  towards the south-east, then the south-west, up to the Liane stream (coming from the south-east);
 towards the southwest by forming a large S, crossing a few series of rapids then forming a loop towards the southeast, until the outlet (coming from the north) from the Lake Raidillon;
 to the southwest by forming serpentines at the end of the segment near a marsh area, until it meets the Métabetchouane River (coming from the southeast).

Toponymy 
The term "Métabetchouane" is associated with two rivers, a lake, a city and an archaeological site.

The toponym “Rivière Métabetchouane Est” was formalized on December 5, 1968, at the Place Names Bank of the Commission de toponymie du Québec.

See also 
 St. Lawrence River
 List of rivers of Quebec

References

External links 
 Official site of the Laurentideds Wildlife Reserve

Rivers of Capitale-Nationale
Laurentides Wildlife Reserve